Arnaud Clément and Michaël Llodra were the defending champions, but lost in the semifinals to Daniel Nestor and Nenad Zimonjić.

Bob Bryan and Mike Bryan won in the final 6–3, 7–6(7–4) against Nenad Zimonjić and Daniel Nestor.

Seeds
All seeds received a bye into the second round. 

  Bob Bryan /  Mike Bryan (champions)
  Nenad Zimonjić /  Daniel Nestor (final)
  Jonas Björkman /  Max Mirnyi (quarterfinals)
  Fabrice Santoro /  Mark Knowles (second round)
  Lukáš Dlouhý /  Pavel Vízner (quarterfinals)
  Simon Aspelin /  Julian Knowle (semifinals)
  Paul Hanley /  Kevin Ullyett (quarterfinals)
  Arnaud Clément /  Michaël Llodra (semifinals)

Draw

Finals

Top half

Bottom half

External links
Draw

Doubles